Niederbarnimer Eisenbahn GmbH is a private railway company operating regional train service in Berlin and Brandenburg, eastern Germany. It is owned by Industriebahn-Gesellschaft Berlin (66.92%) and four districts in the region (33.08%). The company is also an infrastructure manager.

Ownership
The company is owned by Industriebahn-Gesellschaft Berlin (66.92%), which is itself 50% owned by the Captrain group. The districts of Oberhavel, Barnim, Märkisch-Oderland and Oder-Spree own the remaining 33.08% of the company.

Services
NEB has operated routes RB27 since December 2005, which saw the start of their operations as a railway company.

Local services  Berlin – Oranienburg – Löwenberg – Templin 
Local services  Berlin – Ahrensfelde – Werneuchen
Local services  Berlin – Strausberg – Werbig – Kostrzyn (– Gorzow Wielkopolski – Krzyz)
Local services  Berin – Basdorf – Wensickendorf – Schmachtenhagen / Klosterfelde - Groß Schönebeck
Local services  Fürstenwalde (Spree) – Bad Saarow
Local services  Königs Wusterhausen – Beeskow – Frankfurt (Oder)
Local services  Berlin – Oranienburg – Löwenberg – Rheinsberg (Mark)
Local services  Eberswalde – Werbig – Frankfurt (Oder)
Local services  Angermünde – Schwedt
Local services  (Eberswalde –) Angermünde – Prenzlau
Local services  Eberswalde – Joachimsthal – Templin

Fleet
NEB operates a fleet of 7 PESA LINK diesel multiple units, 13 Bombardier Talent DMUs and 15 Stadler Regio-Shuttle RS1 DMUs.

References

External links
 
 

Railway companies of Germany
Private railway companies of Germany
Railway companies established in 2005
Companies based in Brandenburg
Transport in Berlin
Transport in Brandenburg